Halland County is a county (län) on the western coast of Sweden. It corresponds roughly to the cultural and historical province of Halland. The capital is Halmstad.

It borders the counties of Västra Götaland, Jönköping, Kronoberg, Scania and the sea of the Kattegat.

Heraldry
The County of Halland inherited its coat of arms from the province of Halland. When it is shown with a royal crown it represents the County Administrative Board.

Province
Counties mainly serve administrative purposes in Sweden. The culture and history of the area is to be found in its provincial counterpart Halland. The county was designed with virtually the same boundaries as the province. The major exception is a part of Hylte Municipality, which belongs to the province of Småland.

Administration
The main aim of the County Administrative Board is to fulfil the goals set in national politics by the Riksdag and the Government, to coordinate the interests and promote the development of the county, to establish regional goals and safeguard the due process of law in the handling of each case. The County Administrative Board is a Government Agency headed by a governor. See List of Halland Governors.

Politics
Region Halland is the local government for Halland County, and is controlled by the regional council and regional board of Halland. The regional council is elected directly by the residents in regional elections held every four years at the same time as municipal and Riksdag elections.

Among the main responsibilities of the Halland Regional Council (Region Halland) are health care and public transit. The right-wing 'bourgeoisie' parties have held a majority in every election from 1912 until 2014, regaining it in 2018 and losing it again in 2022. However, even when only able to form a minority, the right-wing have controlled the regional board.

Governors

Riksdag elections 
The table details all Riksdag election results of Halland County since the unicameral era began in 1970. The blocs denote which party would support the Prime Minister or the lead opposition party towards the end of the elected parliament.

Municipalities

Sweden's counties are entities for Sweden's municipalities, responsible for such things as child care, education, street planning, etc. Municipalities in Halland County are, from north to south, with the numbers of inhabitants::

In Halland Province: (2021)
Falkenberg: 46,773
Halmstad: 104,573
Hylte: 10,619
Kungsbacka: 85,301
Laholm: 26,319
Varberg: 66,658

Culture

Music groups 
 Gyllene Tider
 Roxette
 Isildurs Bane
 Sonic Syndicate
 Sabel

Localities in order of size
The five most populous localities of Halland County in 2020:

Demographics

Foreign background 
SCB have collected statistics on backgrounds of residents since 2002. These tables consist of all who have two foreign-born parents or are born abroad themselves. The chart lists election years and the last year on record alone.

References

External links
 Halland County Administrative Board
 Halland County Council 
 Regional Association of Local Authorities in Halland
 Hotels in Halland 

 

 
Counties of Sweden
Halland
States and territories established in 1719
1719 establishments in Sweden